Great Eccleston is a village and civil parish in the English county of Lancashire, situated on a coastal plain called the Fylde. At the 2001 United Kingdom census, the parish had a population of 1,473, rising slightly to 1,486 at the Census 2011.

Great Eccleston is part of Wyre district and is in the parliamentary constituency of Wyre and Preston North. Locally, the village is known for its annual agricultural show.

History
Great Eccleston was listed in the Domesday Book of 1086 as Eglestun. In various 13th-century documents it was recorded as Ecclisto, Ecleston and Great Eccleston. In 1066 when the Normans conquered England, the township of Great Eccleston—then part of the ancient hundred of Amounderness—was in the possession of Tostig Godwinson, the brother of King Harold II. Tostig died at the Battle of Stamford Bridge and his lands were subsequently taken over by the Normans. Between 1069 and 1086 William the Conqueror gave Amounderness to Roger de Poitou, an Anglo-Norman baron. In the Domesday Book, the area of Great Eccleston was estimated at two carucates (ploughlands) of land.

The township was originally part of the ecclesiastical parish of St Michael's on Wyre and Great Eccleston's parishioners would have worshipped there at St Michael's Church. In 1723, a chapel of ease to St Michael's was built in a part of Great Eccleston called Copp. It was dedicated to St Anne.

Governance

Great Eccleston is governed locally by a parish council, which is made up of eight elected councillors. Great Eccleston, with the parishes of Inskip with Sowerby, Upper Rawcliffe with Tarnacre and Out Rawcliffe, forms the ward of Great Eccleston, which elects two councillors. Susan Catterall, a Conservative politician, was elected councillor for the ward in 2008. Peter Cartridge, also a Conservative politician, was elected in 2019 as the other ward councillor. The population of the ward at the 2011 Census was 3,581. Great Eccleston was formerly part of the rural district of Garstang. In 1974, the district merged with those of Fleetwood, Thornton Cleveleys, Poulton-le-Fylde and Preesall to form Wyre Borough Council.

The village is represented in the House of Commons of the Parliament of the United Kingdom as part of Wyre and Preston North. It elects one MP by the first past the post system of election. Since its creation for the 2010 general election, Wyre and Preston North has been represented at Parliament by Conservative MP Ben Wallace. Prior to the 2010 general election, Great Eccleston was part of the constituency of Lancaster and Wyre. The village was part of the North West England constituency of the European Parliament.

Geography

Nearby villages include Little Eccleston, Elswick and St Michael's on Wyre and Singleton.

The Fylde Coastal Plain is relatively flat and low–lying, predominantly below 30 m (100 feet) above sea–level, but there is a small knoll called Whitprick Hill roughly halfway between Weston on the B5260 and Wesham that rises to 45 m (148 feet) above sea–level, which has a small reservoir on it next to the OS trig point here.

There are some small short climbs on the A586 road between Great Eccleston and Poulton–Le–Fylde, on an otherwise almost flat, but winding, road near here.

Transport

Great Eccleston is served mainly by Stagecoach Cumbria and North Lancashire service 42 between Lancaster Bus Station and Blackpool Abingdon St., hourly during the daytime during the hours 10.00 to 18.00 and every 90 minutes before 10.00, with an approximate three–hour morning gap Monday–Friday from 06.53 to 09.35, (no early morning service Saturday and Sunday) in the Blackpool–Lancaster direction,  and support for a late–evening service providing three journeys at 90–minute intervals between 20.00 and 23.00 in each direction was recently re–introduced by Lancaster County Council, prior to this the service ended as early as 18.33 from Blackpool, necessitating either the use of trains and/or taxis from Poulton or Blackpool if you wanted to leave the resort later.

Hourly services are provided by Preston Bus Service 74 between Preston Bus Station and Fleetwood and by Blackpool Transport Service 78 between Great Eccleston and St. Annes, each of which runs between 07.00 and 19.00 Mondays–Saturdays with a few late evening journeys on Service 74 to Preston.

The nearest railway station is Poulton–Le–Fylde on the 25 kV electrified Blackpool–Manchester route, approximately 4 miles (6.2 km) away.

Climate

Great Eccleston has a generally temperate maritime climate like much of the British Isles, with cool summers and mild winters.

Culture and community
The Great Eccleston Agricultural Show is held in the village over two days every July along with Tractor Pulling, which also sees an event held in its own right at the same show ground during the August bank holiday. Horse, steam and agricultural shows have been held in Great Eccleston since the mid-19th century. Like many similar rural events, the Great Eccleston Show waned in popularity and ceased to take place in the 1950s; it was reinstated in 1972. Up to 40,000 people were expected to attend the 2011 show. Displays typically feature livestock, horticulture, country crafts, local produce and agricultural vehicles. A farmers' market is held in Great Eccleston every month. A weekly general market takes place each week.

The village is home to three public houses: the Farmers Arms, in Halsalls Square, and the Black Bull Hotel and White Bull, both on High Street.

In business between 1975 and 1998 was the Blinking Owl, an 85-seat restaurant located in a converted farm on Brock Road. The two-tier dining room was in what was formerly the barn. It served nightly (except Mondays) dinners and lunch on Sundays. Owners Keith and Barbara Baxendale took the restaurant's name from a pub in Yorkshire.

See also

Listed buildings in Great Eccleston
List of civil parishes in Lancashire

References
Footnotes

Bibliography

Further reading

External links

Civil parishes in Lancashire
Geography of the Borough of Wyre
The Fylde
Villages in Lancashire